Kings of Damnation 98–04 is mostly a compilation album of Zakk Wylde's Black Label Society, although the first four tracks are pre-1998 and not actual Black Label Society tracks. The limited edition digipak contains a seven-track bonus disc featuring cover songs and videos.

This is the second compilation released to document Zakk Wylde's catalogue, the first being the promotional-only No More Tears EP.

Track listing
"Losin' Your Mind"  – 5:28 – (Pride & Glory)
"Horse Called War" – 5:01 – (Pride & Glory)
"Between Heaven and Hell" – 3:22 – (Wylde)
"Sold My Soul" – 4:53 – (Wylde)
"Bored to Tears" – 4:28
"Bleed for Me" – 5:30
"T.A.Z." – 1:55
"Counterfeit God" – 4:18
"Stronger Than Death" – 4:53
"Speedball" – 0:58
"Demise of Sanity" – 3:23
"We Live No More" – 3:59
"Stillborn" – 3:15
"The Blessed Hellride" – 4:32
"Crazy or High" – 3:34
"House of Doom" – 3:45
"Takillya" – 0:40
"Doomsday Inc." – 4:24 (*)
"S.D.M.F." – 3:32 (*)

(*) previously unreleased

Bonus enhanced CD
"No More Tears" – (Ozzy Osbourne cover)
"A Whiter Shade of Pale" – (Procol Harum cover)
"Heart of Gold" – (Neil Young cover)
"Snowblind" – (Black Sabbath cover)
"The Wizard" – (Black Sabbath cover) – (Pride & Glory)
"In My Time of Dying" – (as made famous by Led Zeppelin) – (Pride & Glory)
"Come Together" – 3:51 (Beatles cover) – (Pride & Glory)
"Counterfeit God" (video)
"Stillborn" (video)
"Bleed for Me" (video)

Credits
Below credits are for the main disc, not the bonus disc:
Zakk Wylde – guitar, vocals, piano, bass
James Lomenzo – bass (tracks 1–4, 16)
Brian Tichy – drums (tracks 1, 2)
Joe Vitale – drums (tracks 3, 4)
Phil Ondich – drums (tracks 5, 8, 9)
Christian Werr – drums (tracks 6, 11)
Craig Nunenmacher – drums (tracks 12–16, 18, 19)
Mike Inez – bass (track 15)
Mike Piazza – "Growls of Doom" on track 9
Ozzy Osbourne – vocals (track 13)
Production/Engineering by Zakk Wylde, Rick Parashar, John Plum, Ron and Howard Albert, Lee DeCarlo, Rony Brack, Eddie Mapp, Barry Conley

Charts

References

Black Label Society albums
2005 greatest hits albums
Spitfire Records albums